The Moa River (Makona River) is a river in west Africa. It arises in the highlands of Guinea and flows southwest, forming parts of the Guinea–Liberia and the Guinea – Sierra Leone borders. It flows into the Southern Province of Sierra Leone. Yenga, Tiwai Island and Sulima are located on the Moa.

Notes

Rivers of Sierra Leone
Rivers of Guinea
Rivers of Liberia
International rivers of Africa
Guinea–Liberia border
Guinea–Sierra Leone border
Southern Province, Sierra Leone
Border rivers